"Hazme Olvidarla" (Make Me Forget Her) is a single by Salvadoran singer Álvaro Torres  released in 1987 through WEA Records as part of Torres' eighth studio album Más Romántico Que Nadie. The song was written by Torres, produced by Enrique Elizondo and it was recorded in George Tobin Studios, North Hollywood, CA.

The song was a success in Latin America and the United States, peaking at number 7 in April 1988 on the Billboard Hot Latin Tracks chart.

Track listing

Personnel 
Credits adapted from Más Romántico Que Nadie liner notes.

Vocals

 Álvaro Torres – lead vocals

Musicians

 David White – arrangements

Production

 Enrique Elizondo – production
Bill Smith – recording

Recording

 Recorded at George Tobin Studios, North Hollywood, CA

Charts

Conjunto Primavera version
Mexican band Conjunto Primavera covered "Hazme Olvidarla" on their 2003 album Decíde Tú. Their version peaked at No. 8 on the Hot Latin Tracks chart and #1 on the Regional Mexican Airplay chart. The track received a nomination for Regional Mexican Airplay Track Of The Year by a Male Group at the 2005 Latin Billboard Music Awards and Regional Mexican Song of the Year at the 2005 Lo Nuestro Awards. It was recognized as one of the best-performing songs of the year at the 2005 BMI Latin Awards.

References

External links
 Lyrics of this song at Musixmatch

1987 singles
Álvaro Torres songs
2004 singles
Conjunto Primavera songs